Kusakovo-Belitsa is a rural locality in Starobelitsky Selsoviet Rural Settlement, Konyshyovsky District, Kursk Oblast, Russia. Population:

Geography 
The village is located on the Belichka River (a left tributary of the Svapa River), 54 km from the Russia–Ukraine border, 78 km north-west of Kursk, 20 km north-west of the district center – the urban-type settlement Konyshyovka, 1.5 km from the selsoviet center – Staraya Belitsa.

 Climate
Kusakovo-Belitsa has a warm-summer humid continental climate (Dfb in the Köppen climate classification).

Transport 
Kusakovo-Belitsa is located 45.5 km from the federal route  Ukraine Highway, 47 km from the route  Crimea Highway, 19 km from the route  (Trosna – M3 highway), 7 km from the road of regional importance  (Fatezh – Dmitriyev), 16 km from the road  (Konyshyovka – Zhigayevo – 38K-038), 8 km from the road  (Dmitriyev – Beryoza – Menshikovo – Khomutovka), 3 km from the road of intermunicipal significance  (38N-144 – Oleshenka with the access road to Naumovka), on the road  (38N-146 – Kusakovo-Belitsa), 1 km from the nearest railway halt 536 km (railway line Navlya – Lgov-Kiyevsky).

The rural locality is situated 83 km from Kursk Vostochny Airport, 179 km from Belgorod International Airport and 281 km from Voronezh Peter the Great Airport.

References

Notes

Sources

Rural localities in Konyshyovsky District